Brookhampton may refer to:

Places

Australia
Brookhampton, Western Australia

England
Brookhampton, Oxfordshire
Brookhampton, Shropshire